Subbotnik may refer to:

Subbotnik, a volunteer workday on a Saturday in the Soviet Union
Subbotnik Festival, an annual international music festival held in Moscow, Russia
Subbotniks, the common name for Russian Judaizers sects

See also
Subotnick (disambiguation)